Christos Pagonis (Lykoudi, 1901 – May 1997) was a Greek Resistance member, teacher and leftist politician. He was elected member of parliament for Larisa with EDA in 1958.

Biography 
He was born in Lykoudi, Elassona and was descended from a farming family. He got involved in syndicalism as member of the Teachers' Federation and resistance activity and politically with EDA and KKE. He was repeatedly arrested and tortured after 1945 and then imprisoned, as well as during the junta of 1967–1974. He was elected member of parliament in the 1958 elections with EDA. He died aged 96 in 1997 and was buried in Elassona on 11 May 1997.

References 

Greek Resistance members
MPs of Larissa
Greek MPs 1958–1961
1901 births
1997 deaths
People from Elassona
Greek torture victims
Resistance to the Greek junta